Seifedin Chabbi (born 4 July 1993) is an Austrian professional footballer who plays as a forward for Austrian Football Bundesliga club SV Ried.

Club career
In February 2020, he joined St Mirren on loan. Despite only making two substitute appearances before the season was cut short due to the COVID-19 pandemic, Chabbi gained a cult following from the fans, with the supporters podcast dubbing him ‘Big Chebs’.

On 16 October 2020, he signed with TSV Hartberg.

On 8 June 2021, he returned to SV Ried on a two-year contract.

Personal life
Chabbi is the son of the Tunisian football manager Lassaad Chabbi.

Honours 
Austria Lustenau
Runners-up
 Austrian Football First League: 2013–14

References

External links 
 

1993 births
Living people
People from Bludenz
Austrian footballers
Austria youth international footballers
Austrian people of Tunisian descent
TSG 1899 Hoffenheim II players
SC Austria Lustenau players
FC St. Gallen players
SK Sturm Graz players
Regionalliga players
2. Liga (Austria) players
Swiss Super League players
Austrian Football Bundesliga players
Austrian expatriate footballers
Expatriate footballers in Switzerland
Austrian expatriate sportspeople in Switzerland
Association football forwards
St Mirren F.C. players
TSV Hartberg players
SV Ried players
Expatriate footballers in Scotland
Austrian expatriate sportspeople in Scotland
Scottish Professional Football League players
Footballers from Vorarlberg